South Buck Shoals Township is one of twelve townships in Yadkin County, North Carolina, United States. The township had a population of 1,293 according to the 2000 census.

Geographically, South Buck Shoals Township occupies  in southwestern Yadkin County.  South Buck Shoals Township's western border is with Wilkes County and its southern border is with Iredell County.

Townships in Yadkin County, North Carolina
Townships in North Carolina